Julian Bühler (born 2 February 1985) is a Swiss football striker, who currently plays for FC Winterthur.

References
 

1985 births
Living people
Swiss men's footballers
FC Thun players
FC Winterthur players
Association football forwards